Gytis is a Lithuanian masculine given name. Notable people with the name include:
Gytis Ivanauskas (born 1980), Lithuanian actor, dancer and choreographer
Gytis Masiulis (born 1998), Lithuanian basketball player
Gytis Padimanskas (born 1972), Lithuanian footballer
Gytis Paulauskas (born 1999), Lithuanian footballer 
Gytis Sirutavičius (born 1983), Lithuanian basketball player
Gytis Stankevičius (born 1994), Lithuanian swimmer

References

Lithuanian masculine given names